Patricia Gloria Goddard (born 23 December 1957) is an English television presenter and actress. She is best known for her television talk show Trisha (1998–2010), which was broadcast on a mid-morning slot on ITV before later being moved to Channel 5. Goddard has been based in the U.S. since 2010, when she started working on Maury as a conflict resolution expert. She also hosted a U.S. version of her own talk show titled The Trisha Goddard Show (2012–2014). Since 2022, Goddard has presented You Are What You Eat.

Early life
Patricia Gloria Goddard was born in London on 23 December 1957, the daughter of Agnes Fortune, a Windrush nurse from Dominica, and an unknown father. She did not discover that the white man who raised her was not her biological father until after her mother's death, though he was the biological father of her three sisters. In her late-50s, Goddard set out to find details of her biological father after a genetics expert insisted that her skin colour made it almost impossible for her to have a white father. As a child, she was educated at an independent school for expatriates in Tanzania, after which she returned to England to attend primary school in Heacham, Norfolk. She then joined Sir William Perkins's School in Chertsey, Surrey, which was a voluntary controlled Church of England girls' grammar school at the time.

Career
Goddard's early career as an air stewardess led to travel writing for magazines and then, after settling in Australia in the mid-1980s, a new career in television. She worked there as a television presenter, most notably on ABC's The 7.30 Report, and also as a host of the children's program Play School. She was later chairperson of the Australian Government's National Community Advisory Group on Mental Health.

In 1998, after returning to the United Kingdom, Goddard became the host of an ITV flagship daytime chat show, the BAFTA-winning Trisha, produced by Anglia Television. She launched her own independent television production company, Town House TV, with former Director of Programmes and Production for ITV Anglia, Malcolm Allsop.

In September 2004, Goddard left ITV to join Five in a new programme titled Trisha Goddard, which made its TV debut on 24 January 2005. Similar in style to her old show, it focussed on relationships, families in crisis, and reunions. The show was produced by Town House Productions. In the early stages of the show, it was observed that repeats of her ITV show continued to achieve higher ratings than her new programme on Five.

In January 2009, Five announced it would not be renewing her contract, for financial reasons.

Goddard has made a number of panellist appearances on ITV's Loose Women, she was a regular panellist in 2002, made three appearances in 2003, with two further appearances in 2014, once in 2019 and the latest on 25 February 2021.

Goddard has appeared in satires of her television programmes. In 2003, a specially-shot clip of her show appeared in the ITV religious fantasy drama The Second Coming. In 2004, she filmed two short scenes for the romantic zombie comedy Shaun of the Dead. Both scenes were filmed on the set of Trisha. In 2004, a facsimile version of her show was featured on Season 3, Episode 1 of the show "Fat Friends" where she interviewed the "slimming group" of the main characters, and where Betty unintentionally revealed her secret that she had given up a baby at the age of fifteen. The episode showed the director telling Trisha to stay on Betty and wait until she revealed her secret.

Her show was also featured on a Comic Relief episode of Little Britain where the character Vicky Pollard met up with her long-lost father. For a What Not to Wear Christmas special aired on 22 December 2004, Goddard was given a fashion makeover by Trinny Woodall and Susannah Constantine.
 She appears very briefly in the 2006 Doctor Who episode "Army of Ghosts" in a parody episode of her own show entitled "I Married a Ghost".

Goddard appeared as a guest on the BBC's The Kumars at No. 42 and was also the guest host for an episode of the second series of The Friday Night Project, for Channel 4. Goddard also had her own talk show on Liverpool radio station City Talk 105.9.

Goddard also made an appearance on Who Wants To Be A Millionaire? raising up to £75,000. She also made an appearance on the BBC show Shooting Stars in 2010. Also that year, she began to make occasional appearances on the American talk programme Maury as a consultant and a guest host.

On 20 October 2011, NBCUniversal Television Distribution announced that it would launch an American version of her eponymous talk show to start in September 2012.  On 1 April 2014, it was announced that this version of the programme had been cancelled after two seasons.

In August 2017, Goddard guest hosted Channel Five's The Wright Stuff for five episodes.

She was a regular panelist on Channel 5's Big Brother's Bit on the Side.

In February 2018, Trisha appeared on an episode of BBC One game show Pointless Celebrities, appearing alongside Johnny Vaughan and Toby Tarrant.

In 2020, Goddard took part in the twelfth series of Dancing on Ice. She was paired with Łukasz Różycki. They were the first couple voted off after the judges chose to save ITV News presenter Lucrezia Millarini and her skating partner Brendyn Hatfield.

In 2021, Goddard appeared on Piers Morgan's Life Stories. On 5 March 2021 it was announced Goddard would present the new revived version of You Are What You Eat.

In 2021, she began presenting on Talkradio and its TV station equivalent, talkTV, from April 2022.

Personal life
Goddard has three younger sisters, Pru, Paula, and Linda. Her youngest sister, Linda, battled schizophrenia and died in 1988 from complications arising from self-inflicted injuries. Goddard has cited this as one of her inspirations in becoming a mental health activist. She has also suffered her own mental health issues, having battled addiction and attempted suicide on at least two occasions.

Goddard has been married and divorced three times. Her first marriage was to Robert Nestdale, an Australian politician and erstwhile director of Unicef Australia; whom she met in 1985 whilst working as an air stewardess. The marriage was short-lived: Nestdale was rumoured to be gay, and died from AIDS in 1989. Goddard has recorded that Nestdale was abusive to her during their relationship.
She met second husband Mark Grieve, a television producer, in 1987 and they were married in 1993. They had two children together and separated in 1996.
Her third husband, Peter Gianfrancesco, is a mental health services professional. They married in 1998, with Goddard's children taking their stepfather's surname. The couple divorced in 2017. In January 2022, Goddard posted on Instagram that she and her partner of four years, who she often colloquially refers to as 'Boo', had got engaged.

Goddard is a survivor of breast cancer, having been diagnosed in 2008.

Goddard lives in Connecticut, USA.

References

External links

Trisha Goddard interviewed on Metralla Rosa

1957 births
Black British television personalities
British children's television presenters
English expatriates in Australia
English expatriates in the United States
English people of Dominica descent
English television personalities
English television presenters
English television talk show hosts
Living people
People educated at Sir William Perkins's School
People from Surrey